Greenfield Quarles (April 1, 1847 – January 14, 1921) was a Confederate States Army and United States Army soldier, judge, and one of the founders of the Sigma Nu fraternity.

Early life
Born in Christian County, Kentucky, his family moved to Arkansas in 1851. Quarles was a graduate of the Virginia Military Institute and during his time, along with James Frank Hopkins and James McIlvaine Riley founded the Sigma Nu Fraternity. In 1873, Quarles married his wife Ida Gist and had a daughter. In his early professional life, Quarles was a public servant having been elected a first district prosecuting attorney, a county judge, and probate judge.

Military service
Quarles served in the Confederate States Army during the civil war as a Private. After the war, he became a charter member of Camp Cawley of the United Confederate Veterans of Helena, Arkansas.

During the Spanish–American War, Quarles volunteered with the Arkansas Volunteer Infantry (Arkansas State Guard and the Spanish–American War) when called upon by the United States Army as a Major. Quarles did not participate in any battles in Cuba during the war.

During World War I, Quarles served as a special agent to the United States Government.

Death
Quarles died at his home in Helena, Arkansas.

References

External links
 

1847 births
1921 deaths
County judges in Arkansas
People from Christian County, Kentucky
People from Helena, Arkansas
Sigma Nu founders